Bree White (born 18 December 1981) is an Australian rules footballer who played for the Collingwood Football Club in the AFL Women's (AFLW).

Early life and state football
White grew up in Ballarat and in her junior days acted as a boundary umpire in local matches. On the occasion that her brothers' club Dunnstown, was missing players, she would fill in. Once she reached the age when there are no more mixed teams, she represented her school Loreto College in football. At the age of 18 she joined VWFL club St Albans Spurs. In 2016, she captained the Spurs, with coach Debbie Lee saying she leads from the front.

During her time at the Spurs, White represented Victoria 3 times.

AFL Women's career
White made her debut in round 1, 2017, in the inaugural AFLW match at IKON Park against , in which she was one of Collingwood's best players, with 10 disposals, 6 kicks and 4 handballs. At the end of the season, she was named in Collingwood's top 10 best and fairest.

Collingwood re-signed White for the 2018 season during the trade period in May 2017.

In October 2017, together with  player Neville Jetta, White helped launch Vichealth's "Walk to School" program which encourages kids to walk, ride or scoot to school and to build healthy habits.

White retired from AFL Women's football at the conclusion of the 2018 season.

Other sports
As well as playing footy, White was also a national under-23 cricketer and represented Victoria's under-19 and senior women cricket teams. She also played gaelic football with London GAA, including featuring in the All-Ireland Junior Ladies' Football Championship Final in 2007.

Statistics
Statistics are correct to the end of the 2018 season.

|- style="background-color: #eaeaea"
! scope="row" style="text-align:center" | 2017
|style="text-align:center;"|
| 33 || 7 || 1 || 0 || 32 || 28 || 60 || 6 || 22 || 0.1 || 0.0 || 4.6 || 4.0 || 8.6 || 0.9 || 3.1
|- 
! scope="row" style="text-align:center" | 2018
|style="text-align:center;"|
| 33 || 4 || 0 || 0 || 18 || 16 || 34 || 10 || 12 || 0.0 || 0.0 || 4.5 || 4.0 || 8.5 || 2.5 || 3.0
|- class="sortbottom"
! colspan=3| Career
! 11
! 1
! 0
! 50
! 44
! 94
! 16
! 34
! 0.1
! 0.0
! 4.5
! 4.0
! 8.5
! 1.5
! 3.1
|}

References

External links

 
 Sports TG Profile

1981 births
Living people
Australian expatriate sportspeople in England
Australian Gaelic footballers
Australian women cricketers
Collingwood Football Club (AFLW) players
Cricketers from Victoria (Australia)
Ladies' Gaelic footballers who switched code
London inter-county Gaelic footballers
Australian rules footballers from Ballarat
Sportswomen from Victoria (Australia)
Victorian Women's Football League players